The 2011 MLP Nations Cup was a women's ice hockey tournament that featured five countries' national teams in addition to Canada, who played with their national under-22 team. Canada has defended the title which they won in 2010. All games were contested at the Bodensee Arena in Kreuzlingen, Switzerland.

Group stage
All times local (CET/UTC +1)

Group A

Group B

Knockout stage

Key: * – final in shootout.

Semifinals

5th-place game

Bronze-medal game

Gold-medal game

Ranking and statistics

Final standings

Scoring leaders
List shows the top skaters sorted by points, then goals. If the list exceeds 10 skaters because of a tie in points, all of the tied skaters are shown.
GP = Games played; G = Goals; A = Assists; Pts = Points; +/− = Plus/minus; PIM = Penalties in minutes; POS = PositionSource:

Leading goaltenders
List contains goaltenders, based on save percentage, who have played 40% of their team's minutes are included in this list.
TOI = Time On Ice (minutes:seconds); GA = Goals against; GAA = Goals against average; Sv% = Save percentage; SO = Shutouts

References

External links

2011-12
2011–12 in women's ice hockey
2011–12 in Swiss ice hockey
2011–12 in German ice hockey
2011–12 in Canadian women's ice hockey
2011–12 in Finnish ice hockey
2011–12 in Russian ice hockey
2011–12 in Swedish ice hockey
2011